Jean Jaillard (6 October 1931 – 12 November 2009) was a French gymnast. He competed in eight events at the 1960 Summer Olympics.

References

External links
 

1931 births
2009 deaths
French male artistic gymnasts
Olympic gymnasts of France
Gymnasts at the 1960 Summer Olympics
People from Carpentras
Sportspeople from Vaucluse
20th-century French people